Jacob Jorrit Bergsma (born 1 February 1986) is a Dutch speed skater and marathon skater. At the 2014 Winter Olympics, he won the gold medal in the 10,000 m. His coach is Jillert Anema.

Biography
Bergsma has been skating for the BAM team since the 2010–11 season. On 10 October 2009 he won his first skating match (the Marathon), the DSB Bank Cup. During the 2009–10 season, he tried to qualify for the Olympic Games for Kazakhstan. During the national championships in the Russian Chelyabinsk, Bergsma won the 5000 m in 6:28.21 and qualified for the World Cup. The ISU refused to let the Dutch Kazakh start, and Bergsma decided to end his Kazakh adventure. Later in the season he won the Alternatieve Elfstedentocht in Austria.

Bergsma won the Dutch Marathon Championships on 10 February 2010 by beating Douwe de Vries. On 29 December 2010, he won the Ronde van Duurswold, the first edition of this classic on natural ice. In 2012 he won the Dutch Marathon Championships on natural ice for the second time.

He became the Dutch 5000 m champion at the Dutch Single Distance Championships in November 2011.
At the first World Cup in Chelyabinsk, he won the 5000 m in a new rink record (6:18.74)

At the 2014 Winter Olympics, Bergsma won gold in the 10,000 m with an Olympic record of 12:44.45. Bergsma also won bronze in the 5000 m.

At the  2018 Winter Olympics, Bergsma won silver in the 10,000 m

Personal life
Bergsma is married to American speed skater Heather Bergsma.

Records

Tournament overview

Source:

World Cup overview

Source
 * = 10000 meter

Medals won

References

External links

1986 births
Dutch male speed skaters
Speed skaters at the 2014 Winter Olympics
Speed skaters at the 2018 Winter Olympics
Speed skaters at the 2022 Winter Olympics
Olympic speed skaters of the Netherlands
Medalists at the 2014 Winter Olympics
Medalists at the 2018 Winter Olympics
Olympic medalists in speed skating
Olympic gold medalists for the Netherlands
Olympic silver medalists for the Netherlands
Olympic bronze medalists for the Netherlands
Sportspeople from Friesland
People from Boarnsterhim
Living people
World Single Distances Speed Skating Championships medalists
20th-century Dutch people
21st-century Dutch people